Yudh may refer to:

 Yodh, the tenth letter of many Semitic alphabets
 Yudh (film), a 1985 Indian Bollywood action thriller film
 Yudh: Three perspectives, one truth, Bharatanatyam Dance Theater production by Savitha Sastry
 Yudh (TV series),  an Indian television psychological thriller miniseries starring Amitabh Bachchan